This is a listing of the commercially published recordings of Chembai Vaidyanatha Bhagavatar (1895-1974).

Gurusmarana
Chembai Vaidyanatha Bhagavatar and K.J.Yesudas - Live concert
Violin: M.S.Gopalakrishnan
Mridangam: T.V.Gopalakrishnan
Ghatam: Alangudi Ramachandran
Venue: Chembai Parthasarathy Swami Temple, Palghat
Label: BMG Crescendo/Tharangini

Chembai - The Greatest
Accompanists: L. Subramaniam (Violin), T. V. Gopalakrishnan (Mridanga), Alangudi Ramachandran (Ghatam)
Label: HMV

Live Concert 1
Title: Sri Chembai Vaidyanatha Bagavathar - Live Concert 1
Accompanists: Lalgudi Jayaraman (Violin), Palani Subramaniam Pillai (Mridanga), Alangudi Ramachandran (Ghatam)
Release Date: 1 January 1987
Label: Inreco

Classical Live Concert
Title: Sri Chembai Vaidyanatha Bagavathar - Classical Live Concert
Label: Inreco

Live Concert
Title: Sri Chembai Vaidyanatha Bagavathar - Live Concert
Label: Gitaa

Gayana Gandharva
Chembai Vaidyanatha Bhagavatar
Vocal Support: Jayan & Vijayan
Violin: M.S.Gopalakrishnan
Mridangam: T. V. Gopalakrishnan
Label: AVM Audio

See also

Chembai Vaidyanatha Bhagavatar
Carnatic Music

Carnatic music
Discography